Wulipai may refer to:

Subdistricts 
 Wulipai, Changsha (五里牌街道), a subdistrict in Furong District, Changsha, Hunan province
 Wulipai, Yueyang (五里牌街道), a subdistrict in Yueyanglou District, Yueyang, Hunan province
 Wulipai, Leiyang (五里牌街道), a subdistrict of Leiyang City, Hunan
 Wulipai, Linxiang (五里牌街道), a subdistrict in Linxiang, Hunan

Towns 
 Wulipai, Chenzhou (五里牌镇), a town of Suxian District, Chenzhou, Hunan